"Billy's Got His Beer Goggles On" is a song written by Philip White and Michael Mobley, and recorded by American country music artist Neal McCoy.  It was released in March 2005 as the lead-off single to his album That's Life. It was McCoy's first release from his vanity label 903 Music.  The song reached number 10 on Hot Country Songs in 2005.

Content
The song describes a man who, after his girlfriend leaves him, becomes so intoxicated that he is said to be wearing beer goggles, a term used to indicate the lack of sexual inhibition when one is drunk. Everything (the girls, barfights, etc.) looks good to him.

Music video
The music video was directed by Buddy Swell. It features actor and comedian Rob Schneider and zookeeper Jack Hanna.

Chart performance
"Billy's Got His Beer Goggles On" debuted at number 60 on the U.S. Billboard Hot Country Singles & Tracks for the week of April 16, 2005.

Year-end charts

References

2005 singles
2005 songs
Neal McCoy songs